Ishwarlal was a Bollywood Hindi actor, director and producer, active from 1930 to 1966. He was born 9 October 1911 at Waghania, Bombay Presidency, British India as Hariprashad Joshi. He died on 22 January 1969 in Bombay (Mumbai), India aged 57. He acted in 86 films, directed 11 and sang in 14.

As actor 

1973 Kahani Kismat Ki
1963 Meri Surat Teri Ankhen
1963 Jevi Chhun Tevi
1963 Lakho Vanzaro
    Satyawan Savitri
1962 Aalha Udal
    Baghdad Ki Raaten
    Bezubaan
    Janam Janamna Sathi
1961 Chundali Chokha
    Hiro Salat
1959 Paigham
1958 Gopichand
1953 Shuk Rambha
    Naulakha haar
1952 Indrasen
    Mr. Sampat
1951 Jai Shankar
    Samsaram
1950 Sati Narmada
    Bhagwan Shri Krishna
1949 Matribhoomi
    Nar Narayan
1947 Rivaj
1946 Sohni Mahiwal
    Subhadra
    Maharana Pratap
1945 Badi Maa
    Sharbati Aankhen
    Samrat Chandragupta
1944 Manorama
    Lalkar
    Across The River
    Dil Ki Baat
    Uss Paar
1943 Kurbani
    Zaban
    Bansari
1942 Maheman
    Chandni
    Dhiraj
    Fariyaad
1941 Shaadi
    Ummeed
1940 Diwali
    Holi
    Aaj Ka Hindustan
    Musafir
1939 Meri Ankhen
    Adhuri Kahani
    Thokar
    Ghazi Salahuddin
1938 Ban Ki Chidiya
    Billi
1937 Toofani Toli
    Mitti Ka Putla
    Shana Parwana
    Sharafi Loot
    Zameen Ka Chand
    Pardesi Pankhi
    Dil Faroshii
1936 Rangila Raja
    Laheri Lala
    Jwalamukhi
    Chalak Chor
    Raj Ramani
    Sipahi Ki Sajani
    Struggle
    Dil Ka Dakoo
 Matlabi  Duniya
 Prabhu Ka Pyara
1935 Barrister's Wife
 Raat Ki Rani
 Desh Daasi
 Bombshell
 College Girl
 Noor-e-Vatan
 Qeemti Ansoo
1934 Toofani Taruni
 Veer Babruvahan
 Sitamgarh
 Tara Sundari
 Nadira
 Toofan Mail
1933 Bhola Shikar
1932 Bhutia Mahaal
 Sipah  Salan
 Lal Swar
 Chaar Chakram
1931 Ghunghatwali
 Banke Sawaria
 Katil Katari
 Mojili Mashuk
 Premi Jogan
1930 Jobanna Jadu
 Ranak Devi
 Romances of Radha
 Sheikh Chilli

References

Male actors in Hindi cinema
Indian male film actors
Hindi-language film directors
Bollywood playback singers
1911 births
1969 deaths
20th-century Indian male singers
20th-century Indian singers